Mariz Ricketts is a Filipino singer, television host, film and television actress, and film producer in the Philippines.

Career
Mariz performed the theme song in the film Ang Lihim Ng Golden Buddha (1989). She became a popular as a singer on her songs such as Kasalanan Ba?, Iyong-Iyo and Paano Pa Kita Malilimutan? Mariz produced action films through Rockets Productions, with husband Ronnie Ricketts.

She is back on television as co-host of German Moreno in Walang Tulugan with the Master Showman. She appeared on one of the top rating GMA TV series Dapat Ka Bang Mahalin? with the love team Kris Bernal and Aljur Abrenica. She plays as the mother of Bernal.

Personal life
She is married to action star Ronnie Ricketts on December 18, 1993. The couple is blessed with two daughters, Marella and Rachelle. Marella Ricketts is introduced in the movie The Fighting Chefs.

Filmography

Television
Family Feud (2022) – Contestant
MARS Pa More (2022) – Guest
Apoy sa Langit (2022) – Blessie Atienza
Bet on Your Baby (2017) – Guest
The Lola's Beautiful Show (2017) – Guest
Sabado Badoo (2015) – Archival footage featured
Aso ni San Roque (2012–2013) – Rosa Santiago
Valiente (2012) – Dr. Lourdes Asuncion
Ang Utol Kong Hoodlum (2011) – Salve
Ikaw Sana (2009–2010) – Sonia Garcia-Montemayor
Dapat Ka Bang Mahalin? (2009) – Linda Ramos
Dyesebel (2008) – Melba
Love to Love: Love Blossoms (2004)
Walang Tulugan with the Master Showman (1997–2013) – Co-host
Valiente (1992–1997) – Maila Braganza-Valiente
GMA Supershow (1989–1997) – Co-host

Movies
The Millionaire's Wife (2016)
Lagot Ka Sa Kuya Ko (2006)
Mano Mano 2: Ubusan Ng Lakas (2001)
Madaling Mamatay, Mahirap Mabuhay (1996)
Matinik Na Kalaban (1995)
Pandoy: Alalay Ng Panday (1993)
Patapon (1993)
Ganti Ng Api (1991)
Wooly Booly 2: Ang Titser Kong Alien (1990)
Paikot-Ikot (1990)
Tootsie Wootsie: Ang Bandang Walang Atrasan (1990)
Wooly Booly: Ang Classmate Kong Alien (1989)
Aso't Pusa (1989)

Discography

Songs
"Kasalanan Ba?"
"Salamat"
"Titig Pag-ibig"
"Iyong-Iyo"
"Twing Kasama Mo Sya"
"Tayo Na"
"Dito Na Tayo"

Album: Mariz (Traxound/Ivory 1988)
SIDE A
Tayo Na
Taray
Red Light
Kay Daling Sabihin
SIDE B
Kasalanan Ba?
Paano Ako
Heartbeat
Dito Na Tayo

Album: Mariz (Vicor 1989)
SIDE A
Iyong-iyo
Titig Pagibig
A New Start
Crazy Game
SIDE B
Lies
Ngayong Wala Na Ako
Twing Kasama Mo Siya
Lagi Na Lang

Album: Naaalala Ko Na (Alpha) (1993)
Changes
Kahit Na Tayo Ay Nagkalayo
Naaalala Ko Pa
Sayang Lang
Paano Pa Kita Malilimutan?
Dito Sa Piling Mo 
Hindi Magwawakas 
Ibibigay, Iaalay 
Pinakamamahal 
Sana'y Ikaw Na Nga

Christmas album
Sa Paskong Ito

References

External links

Living people
Filipino film actresses
20th-century Filipino women singers
Filipino television actresses
Year of birth missing (living people)
GMA Network personalities
ABS-CBN personalities
TV5 (Philippine TV network) personalities